This is a list of electoral district results for the 1973 New South Wales state election.

Results by Electoral district

Albury

Armidale

Ashfield

Auburn

Balmain

Bankstown

Barwon

Bass Hill

Bathurst

Blacktown

Bligh

Blue Mountains

Broken Hill

Burrendong

Burrinjuck

Burwood

Byron

Campbelltown

Canterbury

Casino

Castlereagh

Cessnock

Charlestown

Clarence

Coogee 

This result was annulled by the Court of Disputed Returns and a by-election was held.

Corrimal

Cronulla

Davidson

Drummoyne

Dubbo

Earlwood

East Hills

Eastwood

Fairfield

Fuller

Georges River

Gloucester

Gordon 

The sitting member was Harry Jago who failed to nominate in time.

Gosford 

The sitting member was Keith O'Connell (Labor) however the 1973 redistribution made Gosford a notional Liberal seat and O'Connell successfully contested the new seat of [[Results of the 1973 New South Wales state election (Legislative Assembly)#Peats|Peats]].

Goulburn

Granville

Hawkesbury

Heathcote

Heffron 

Heffron  was a new seat with a notional Labor majority.

Hornsby

Hurstville

Illawarra

Kirribilli

Kogarah

Ku-ring-gai 

Ku-ring-gai was a new seat with a notional Liberal majority.

Lake Macquarie

Lakemba

Lane Cove

Lismore

Liverpool

Maitland

Manly

Maroubra

Marrickville

Merrylands

Miranda

Monaro

Mosman

Mount Druitt

Munmorah

Murray

Murrumbidgee

Nepean 

The sitting member was Ron Mulock (Labor) however the 1973 redistribution made Gosford a notional Liberal seat and Mulock successfully contested the new seat of [[Results of the 1973 New South Wales state election (Legislative Assembly)#Penrith|Penrith]].

Newcastle

Northcott

Orange

Oxley

Parramatta

Peats 

Peats was a new seat with a notional Labor majority.

Penrith 

Penrith was a new seat with a notional Labor majority.

Phillip

Pittwater 

Pittwater was a new seat with a notional Liberal majority.

Raleigh

Rockdale

South Coast 

The sitting member Jack Beale resigned from Parliament in October 1973.

Sturt

Tamworth

Temora

Tenterfield

The Hills

Upper Hunter

Vaucluse

Wagga Wagga

Wakehurst

Wallsend

Waratah

Waverley

Wentworthville

Willoughby

Wollondilly

Wollongong

Woronora

Yaralla

Young

See also 
 Candidates of the 1973 New South Wales state election
 Members of the New South Wales Legislative Assembly, 1973–1976

Notes

References 

1973 Legislative Assembly
New South Wales Legislative Assembly